101 Squadron of the Israeli Air Force, also known as the First Fighter Squadron, is Israel's first fighter squadron, formed on May 20, 1948, six days after Israel declared its independence. Initially flying the Avia S-199, it has since operated the Supermarine Spitfire, North American Mustang, Dassault Mystere IV, Dassault Mirage IIICJ, IAI Nesher and IAI Kfir. It currently operates out of Ramat-David Airbase, flying the F-16C Fighting Falcon.

History 
101 Squadron was formed on May 20, 1948, at two air bases simultaneously: IAF Ekron (former RAF Aqir, currently Tel-Nof Airbase) and Žatec (code-named "Zebra") in northwestern Czechoslovakia, a former Luftwaffe airfield close to a Messerschmitt production facility, where pilots received initial basic type flight training on the Avia S-199s, Czechoslovak-built copies of the Bf 109G with 1,320 hp Junkers Jumo 211F powerplants. During one ferry flight some of the squadron's 15 aircraft were forced to land in Greece, and were immediately impounded, so during the next ferry flight a C-46 was used as a navigation guide, and a corvette was readied off the coast in case any aircraft had to be ditched and pilots rescued from water. Four of these flew the squadron's first mission on May 29, strafing the Egyptian ground forces near Ad Halom, in the prelude to Operation Pleshet. 101 Squadron was responsible for the Israeli Air Force's first aerial victories when on 3 June 1948, Modi Alon, after taking off from Herzliya Airport, shot down a pair of Royal Egyptian Air Force C-47s which had just bombed Tel Aviv.

A makeshift strip located around the current Herzliya Airport was the main operating base of the squadron between June and October 1948, and the squadron moved to it after un-assembled planes were strafed on the ground on May 30th. The airfield was used as it was some distance behind the front lines, and was clandestine; it was a purpose built strip that was constructed after the beginning of hostilities in between the orange orchards around Herzliya, and did not appear on published maps. During these initial operations, the squadron operated with a few planes in the face of the Arab forces' near-Air supremacy and the airplanes were dispersed between the orange trees when parked. The squadron was moved in October to Hatzor Airbase from the strip in due to its unsuitability in rainy conditions, probable loss of clandestine status, fluidity of the front lines which made former British bases safe for use, and a shift in the balance of air superiority towards the Israelis.  In 2021 the squadron was relocated from Hatzor Airbase to Ramat David Airbase alongside the 105th Squadron.

See also 

Yosef Alon

Giora Epstein
Aaron "Red" Finkel 
Mitchell Flint
Avi Lanir
Gordon Levett
Christopher Magee
Milton Rubenfeld
Iftach Spector
Bob Vickman
Ezer Weizman
 George Lichter

References

External links 
Global Security Profile
101 Squadron, Israel's first fighter squadron 

Israeli Air Force squadrons
Military units and formations established in 1948